Ulusoy is a Turkish surname. Notable people with the surname include:

 Bülent Ulusoy (born 1978), Turkish boxer
 Çağatay Ulusoy (born 1990), Turkish model and actor
 Devrim Cenk Ulusoy (born 1973), Turkish free-diver
 Duygu Ulusoy (born 1987), Turkish female skier
 Fatih Ulusoy (born 1980), Turkish volleyball player
 Haluk Ulusoy (born 1958), Turkish Football Federation president
 İsmail Cem Ulusoy (born 1996), Turkish basketball player
 Özge Ulusoy (born 1982), Turkish model, retired ballet dancer

Turkish-language surnames